The 1876 Yale Bulldogs football team represented Yale University in the 1876 college football season. The team finished with a 3–0 record and was retroactively named national champion by the Billingsley Report, National Championship Foundation, and Parke H. Davis.  The Yale team defeated rival Harvard for the first time. Walter Camp also played for the first time. The team's captain was Eugene V. Baker.

The Princeton-Yale matchup is considered to have popularized the tradition of Thanksgiving football. It effectively decided the national championship after Princeton defeated Columbia. Thompson and Camp executed the first "legal" forward pass in football history. Early in the game, Camp ran for a good gain on a play, however when he was finally tackled, he threw the ball forward to O. D. Thompson, who ran for a touchdown. The Princeton players protested the play. Since the rules of football were still unclear in 1876, a coin toss was used by the referee to decide if the play stood. Yale won the toss and the touchdown stood.

Schedule

References

Yale
Yale Bulldogs football seasons
College football national champions
College football undefeated seasons
Yale Bulldogs football